Ohlertidion is a genus of comb-footed spiders (family Theridiidae) that was first described by J. Wunderlich in 2008.  it contains three species with a holarctic distribution, including Greenland: O. lundbecki, O. ohlerti, and O. thaleri. A 2019 genetic study proposed to synonymize this genus with Heterotheridion; however, the evidence was based predominantly on COI barcoding, which is a useful tool for separating species, but is less useful for determining higher taxa.

See also
 List of Theridiidae species
Heterotheridion

References

Further reading

Araneomorphae genera
Holarctic spiders
Spiders of North America
Spiders of Russia
Theridiidae